(Van) Amerongen is a Dutch toponymic surname, meaning "from Amerongen". Notable people with the surname include:

Gerard Amerongen (1914–2013), Canadian politician and lawyer
Jerry Van Amerongen, American cartoonist
Martin van Amerongen (1941–2012), Dutch journalist, publisher, and writer
Otto Wolff von Amerongen (1918–2007), German businessman
Sophia van Amerongen (circa 1550), subject of a portrait, oil on panel, in the Philadelphia Museum of Art attributed to Maarten van Heemskerck (1498-1574)

Dutch-language surnames